Mathieu Cafaro (born 25 March 1997) is a French professional footballer who plays as a midfielder for  club Saint-Étienne, on loan from Belgian First Division A club Standard Liège.

Club career

Toulouse
Cafaro is a youth exponent from Toulouse. He made his Ligue 1 debut on 10 September 2015 against Bastia. He was released from the club on 3 April 2017 with Odsonne Édouard due to inappropriate behavior outside the club which consisted of shooting a passer-by with an airsoft gun. He later admitted that he was the one that shot the gun. On 13 June, the Toulouse Prosecutor asked that Édouard be charged with a four months suspended prison sentence and a €6,000 fine for his involvement in the incident. Édouard assured that Cafaro was the author of the shot while Cafaro then claimed to have not been in the car at the time of the shooting.

Reims
Cafaro helped Reims win the 2017–18 Ligue 2, which earned them promotion to the Ligue 1 for the 2018–19 season. He participated in one league match during the campaign, a 3–1 win over Niort on 27 April 2018. Cafaro would go on to score twelve goals in eighty-two Ligue 1 matches for Reims before leaving the club in January 2022.

Standard Liège 
On 11 January 2022, Cafaro signed for Belgian club Standard Liège. The deal reportedly involved no transfer fee, although Reims were given a "considerable" sell-on percentage fee.

Loan to Saint-Étienne
On 20 July 2022, Cafaro joined Saint-Étienne on a season-long loan with an option-to-buy.

Personal life
Cafaro is of Italian descent through his paternal grandfather.

Honours
Reims
 Ligue 2: 2017–18

References

1997 births
Living people
Association football midfielders
French footballers
French people of Italian descent
Toulouse FC players
Stade de Reims players
Standard Liège players
AS Saint-Étienne players
Ligue 1 players
Ligue 2 players
Belgian Pro League players
French expatriate footballers
Expatriate footballers in Belgium
French expatriate sportspeople in Belgium